Talbut may refer to:
Charles Talbut Onions (1873–1965), English grammarian
John Talbut (1940–2020), English footballer
Talbut (unicorn), a fictional leader in Kleo The Misfit Unicorn

See also 
Talbot (surname)